Zillah may refer to:


Geography
Zillah (country subdivision), a country subdivision in Bangladesh, India and Pakistan
Zillah, Washington, United States, a city

People
Zillah Smith Gill (1859–1937), New Zealand local politician and community leader
Cecilia "Zillah" Andrén, winner of Talang 2007, a Sweden TV talent show - see Zillah & Totte
Zillah Minx, a member of Rubella Ballet, a gothic anarcho-punk band

Fictional characters
Zillah, a vampire from Lost Souls, by Poppy Z Brite
Zillah, the wife of Abel in Cain, by Lord Byron
Zillah, from Flora Thompson's Lark Rise to Candleford
Zillah, from Wuthering Heights, a novel by Emily Brontë
Zillah, a Native American princess who was thought to be capable of witchcraft and sentenced to die in A Swiftly Tilting Planet, the fourth book of the Space-Time books. Her descendant, who was named after her and her grandmother, is now known as Mrs. O'Keeffe, the hard-hearted and unloving mother of Calvin and mother-in-law to Meg Murry, her highly intelligent younger brother Charles Wallace and twins Sandy and Dennys

Other uses
Zillah (biblical figure), a wife of Lamech, a descendant of Cain
USS Zillah (SP-2804), a patrol vessel that served in the United States Navy in 1918
Zilla, a 19th-century wooden steamboat - see Miztec (schooner barge)
Zillah High School, Zillah, Washington
Zillah (Senatorius Sacerdos Harpyiae) name given to sigil verve referring to Obsession (and division).  Published circa 2005 - 2006.

See also
Zilla (disambiguation)
Zella, Libya, a town in north-central Libya